Ahn Daniel (born August 16, 1994), better known by his stage name Niel (Hangul: 니엘), is a South Korean singer, songwriter and actor. He is a member of the South Korean boy group Teen Top. Niel released his first solo EP titled oNiely on February 16, 2015.

Solo career
On December 26, 2012, Niel, alongside Beast's Yoseob, 2AM's Jo Kwon, MBLAQ's G.O, and Infinite's Woohyun formed a 5-member one-time unit named Dramatic Blue for their song, "Tearfully Beautiful", for SBS Gayo Daejeon's The Color of K-Pop. In 2013, he featured in Fanta's Advertising song "Fanta Time" alongside A Pink's Eun-ji and Lee Kwang-soo.

On January 5, 2015, it was announced that Niel would be making his official solo debut in February. on January 27,at the program of Mnet's "4 Things Show" Niel released the self-produced track "Affogato", which would be included on his first solo album. The music video for his title song "Lovekiller" came out on February 16, featuring rapper Dok2. His solo mini album oNiely which contains seven songs, was released on the same day and topped the Gaon chart. On April 14, Niel released his repackaged album oNiely 'Spring Love, as well as the music video for its title track "Spring Love" , featuring singer-songwriter Juniel.

On May 15, 2015, Niel and other artists including Exo, Sistar and Ailee sang a KBS1's Special Program 'I Am Korea' theme song "The Day We Meet" for Gwangbok 70th Anniversary."

Niel released his second mini album Love Affair... January 16, 2017, containing seven songs, including the title track of the same name.

On June 3, 2020, Niel joined Overwatch Contenders team O2 Blast as an "Honorary Player".

On December 28, 2021, Niel announced that he will not renew his contract with TOP Media starting from January 10, 2022.  However, he will still remain as a member of Teen Top.

In August 2022, Niel signed a contract with New Entry.

In November 2022, Niel made a comeback with his 3rd mini album "A to Z", which is set to be released on November 28.

Filmography

Film

Television series

Web series

Variety shows

Theater

Discography

EPs

Singles

As lead artist

Soundtrack appearances

Awards and nominations

References

External links

1994 births
Living people
People from South Chungcheong Province
South Korean dance musicians
South Korean male idols
South Korean male film actors
South Korean male singers
South Korean male television actors
South Korean pop singers
South Korean Roman Catholics
Teen Top members